John Duncanson may refer to:

 John Duncanson (minister) (c. 1530–1601), Scottish clergyman, tutor and chaplain to King James VI
 John Duncanson (broadcaster), former British television continuity announcer and presenter
 Sir John Duncanson (industrialist), British industrialist